Kenneth Henry James Mountford (27 May 1924 – 19 January 1967) was a New Zealand rugby league player who represented New Zealand. He was the brother of fellow players Ces Mountford and Bill Mountford.

Playing career
Mountford played for Blackball of the West Coast Rugby League during the 1940s along with his two brothers. Blackball held the Thacker Shield at the time. He represented both the West Coast and the South Island.

He played for the New Zealand national rugby league team in six test matches on the 1947 tour of Great Britain and France.

Later years

A coal miner, Mountford was one of 19 miners who lost their lives in the Strongman Mine gas explosion on 19 January 1967.

References

1924 births
1967 deaths
Blackball players
New Zealand coal miners
New Zealand national rugby league team players
New Zealand rugby league players
Other Nationalities rugby league team players
Place of birth missing
Rugby league five-eighths
Rugby league halfbacks
Rugby league locks
South Island rugby league team players
West Coast rugby league team players